Konjum Kumari is 1963 Indian Tamil-language action comedy film, directed by G. Viswanathan and produced by T. R. Sundaram of Modern Theatres. The script was written by Mana and K. Devarajan, with music by Vedha. The film stars K. R. Indira Devi, Manorama and R. S. Manohar, with S. V. Ramadas, A. Karunanidhi and K. K. Soundar in supporting roles.

Plot 
Alli (Manorama) is a veritable jungle queen who rescues Rajangam (R. S. Manohar), where a gang of robbers attack him in the forest. She loses her heart to him, but he turns her down. So, the rifle-toting heroine forces him to marry her at gunpoint. When the villain abducts Rajangam's brother for ransom, it's Alli who comes to the rescue again. How this and other events unite the couple forms the rest of the movie.

Cast 
Cast according to the opening credits

Male
 Manohar as Rajangam
 Ramadas as Jambulingam
 Mohan as Manickam
 Karunanidhi as Mannaru
 B. Sethupathi
 Pandian
 Azhwar Kuppusami as Sahayam
 K. K. Soundar as Soundar
 Mani
 K. K. Rathnam
 V. P. S. Mani

Female
 Manorama as Alli
 Kumari Rukmani as Kannamma
 K. R. Indira Devi
 Pushpamala as Thangam
 S. Mohana as Prema
 Baby Chandrakala as Meena
Dance
 Sasi-Kala-Mala

Production 
Konjum Kumari was the film for Manorama in a leading role. The film was directed by G. Viswanathan and produced by T. R. Sundaram of Modern Theatres. Cinematography was handled by Melli Irani, and editing by L. Balu. While the main story was written by Mana, K. Devarajan wrote the comedy track.

Soundtrack 
Music was composed by Vedha and lyrics were written by Vaali, Karunaidasan and Nallathambi. The playback singers consist of P. Susheela, K. J. Yesudas, Tiruchi Loganathan, A. G. Rathnamala and B. Vasantha.

Reception 
The film was a modest success, largely due to viewers' reluctance to accept Manorama in a leading role.

References

External links 
 

1960s action comedy films
1960s Tamil-language films
1963 films
Films directed by T. R. Sundaram
Indian action comedy films
Indian black-and-white films